Christopher Daniel Sullivan (July 14, 1870 – August 3, 1942) was an American politician from New York who served twelve terms as a United States Congressman from 1917 to 1941.

Life
Born in New York City, he attended the public schools, St. James Parochial School, and St. Mary's Academy. Then he engaged in the real-estate business, and entered politics, joining Tammany Hall.

Political career

State Senate 
He was a member of the New York State Senate from 1907 to 1916, sitting in the 130th through 139th New York State Legislatures.

Congress 
In 1916, Sullivan was elected as a Democrat to the 65th United States Congress. He was subsequently re-elected 11 times, serving through the 76th Congress. In all, he held office from March 4, 1917, to January 3, 1941.

While in the House he was Chairman of the Committee on Expenditures in the Department of Labor (65th Congress).

Sullivan did not seek re-election in 1940.

Retirement and death 
He resided in New York City until his death in 1942. He was interred at Calvary Cemetery in Woodside, New York.

Family 
State Senator Charles D. Perry (1907–1964) was his nephew.  Charles was the son of Christopher's half-brother Henry Charles Perry, known as Harry Perry.  (Harry was also involved in New York politics.)

References

External links
 

1870 births
1942 deaths
American Roman Catholics
Burials at Calvary Cemetery (Queens)
Democratic Party New York (state) state senators
Democratic Party members of the United States House of Representatives from New York (state)
People from Manhattan